Akasa Singh (born 2 April 1994) better known by her stage name AKASA is an Indian singer and performer. She is most known for her song Naagin with Aastha Gill. She debuted with Kheech Meri Photo from the 2016 Bollywood movie Sanam Teri Kasam. Starting her career through reality shows, she was signed to Sony Music India. Her debut pop single "Thug Ranjha" crossed 27M+ views in one month and became the most watched Indian video worldwide on YouTube.

She has had many movies songs to her credit like Aithey Aa from Bharat, Dil Na Jaaneya from Good Newzz, as well as hit singles like Thug Ranjha, Maserati, Naiyyo, Yaad Na Aana, Shola, Teri Meri Ladayi, etc.

Akasa made her television debut as a host for Secret Side on MTV Beats. She participated as a contestant in Bigg Boss 15.

Career 
Akasa started her career with Mika Singh where she was the only girl in a band of 10 male members. She was a contestant in India's Raw Star. Her mentor on the show, Himesh Reshammiya, promised Akasa that he would give her a break in Bollywood which she got through the song "Kheech Meri Photo" of the 2016 movie Sanam Teri Kasam. Akasa was also a contestant in Amazon Prime's original reality show The Remix with DJ Skip.

In 2017, Akasa, who has also featured in Being Indian's Judaai and Jugni Ji released a duet with Ricky Martin called Vente Pa Ca. She has also done a mashup of Ed Sheeran's Shape of You and Badshah's Mercy and released a cover version of Zara Zara song from the movie RHTDM.

Akasa released her duet single "Thug Ranjha" on 18 May 2018. Along with her, the video featured two male actors, Shasvat Seth and Tiger Zinda Hai actor Paresh Pahuja. The official video went out to be the most viewed Indian video on YouTube worldwide. In 2021 She participated in Bigg Boss 15.

Discography

Soundtrack albums

Singles

Television

References

External links 

Living people
Indian women playback singers
1994 births
Bigg Boss (Hindi TV series) contestants